Chantal Lauby (born 23 March 1948) is a French actress, film director, screenwriter, humorist, comedian and television host. She is a member and founder of the group of comedians Les Nuls alongside Bruno Carette, Alain Chabat and Dominique Farrugia.

Career 
Born in Gap, Chantal Lauby spent her childhood in Auvergne, between Auzon and Clermont-Ferrand. She begins to television as an announcer on FR3 Auvergne. Her career on regional offices of France 3 and Radio France where she meets Bruno Carette.

Personal life 
She is the mother of Jennifer Ayache (born 1983), singer of the French rock band Superbus.
In one of her films, the album Aéromusical was the official soundtrack of the movie.

Theatre

Filmography

External links

1957 births
French film actresses
Living people
20th-century French actresses
21st-century French actresses
People from Gap, Hautes-Alpes
French television actresses
French film directors
French women film directors
French women screenwriters
French screenwriters
French television presenters
Officiers of the Ordre des Arts et des Lettres
French women television presenters